Bad Bramstedt-Land is an Amt ("collective municipality") in the district of Segeberg, in Schleswig-Holstein, Germany. It is situated around Bad Bramstedt, which is the seat of the Amt, but not part of it.

The Amt Bad Bramstedt-Land consists of the following municipalities:

References

Ämter in Schleswig-Holstein
Segeberg